The 2002 Sparkassen Cup doubles was the tennis doubles event of the thirteenth edition of the Sparkassen Cup; a WTA Tier II tournament held in Leipzig, Germany. 

Elena Likhovtseva and Nathalie Tauziat were the defending champions but Tauziat chose not to compete in 2002. Likhovtseva partnered with Natasha Zvereva but they were defeated in the semifinals. 

Unseeded American pairing Alexandra Stevenson and Serena Williams won the title, defeating Janette Husárová and Paola Suárez in the final, 6–3, 7–5. This title remains the only doubles title won by Serena Williams not partnered with older sister Venus.

Seeds

Draw

External links
 2002 Sparkassen Cup Draw

Sparkassen Cup (tennis)
2002 WTA Tour